Ministry of Equipment and Transport may refer to:

 Ministry of Equipment and Transport (Morocco)
 Ministry of Equipment and Transport (Mali)

See also:

 Ministry of Transport